The 2017 NBL season was the 36th season of the National Basketball League. For the second year in a row, the league fielded seven teams.

The regular season commenced on Thursday 16 March in Invercargill with the Southland Sharks hosting the Nelson Giants at Stadium Southland. The season contained 13 weeks of regular season games followed by a Final Four weekend in June at Tauranga's ASB BayPark Arena. The seven teams played every team on three occasions to make up an 18-game round robin season.

With an 18–0 record, the Wellington Saints made NBL history by becoming the first team to complete a perfect regular season. They went on to post a perfect 20–0 campaign after sweeping the Final Four and collecting their 10th NBL championship in the process.

Team information

Summary

Regular season standings

Final Four

Awards

Player of the Week

Statistics leaders
Stats as of the end of the regular season

Regular season
 Most Valuable Player: Corey Webster (Wellington Saints)
 NZ Most Valuable Player: Corey Webster (Wellington Saints)
 Most Outstanding Guard: Corey Webster (Wellington Saints)
 Most Outstanding NZ Guard: Corey Webster (Wellington Saints)
 Most Outstanding Forward: Tai Wesley (Wellington Saints)
 Most Outstanding NZ Forward/Centre: Marcel Jones (Canterbury Rams)
 Scoring Champion: Corey Webster (Wellington Saints)
 Rebounding Champion: Amir Williams (Hawke's Bay Hawks)
 Assist Champion: Jarrod Kenny (Hawke's Bay Hawks)
 Coach of the Year: Kevin Braswell (Wellington Saints)
 All-Star Five:
 G: Shea Ili (Wellington Saints)
 G: Corey Webster (Wellington Saints)
 F: Mitch McCarron (Super City Rangers)
 F: Marcel Jones (Canterbury Rams)
 C: Tai Wesley (Wellington Saints)

Final Four
 Finals MVP: Shea Ili (Wellington Saints)

References

External links
 2017 fixtures
 Replay of 2017 grand final
 Otago side to play Southland Sharks
 Tauranga in contention to host NBL final four and join league in 2018
 Wellington Saints tipped to go back-to-back in National Basketball League
 NZ NBL ready for stellar season
 How the 2017 New Zealand Basketball League is shaping up
 Saints and Sharks head to Grand-Final
 Wellington Saints perfect till the end in historic undefeated season

National Basketball League (New Zealand) seasons
NBL